British NVC community OV6 (Cerastium glomeratum - Fumaria muralis ssp. boraei community) is one of the open habitat communities in the British National Vegetation Classification system. It is one of six arable weed and track-side communities of light, less-fertile acid soils.

It is a widespread community. There are no subcommunities.

Community composition

The following constant species are found in this community:
 Scarlet pimpernel (Anagallis arvensis)
 Sticky mouse-ear (Cerastium glomeratum)
 Common ramping-fumitory (Fumaria muralis ssp. boraei)
 Toad rush (Juncus bufonius)
 Annual meadow-grass (Poa annua)
 Groundsel (Senecio vulgaris)
 Prickly sow-thistle (Sonchus asper)

Four rare species are associated with the community:
 Babington's leek (Allium babingtonii)
 Lesser quaking-grass (Briza minor)
 Tall ramping-fumitory (Fumaria bastardii)
 Small-flowered catchfly (Silene gallica)

Distribution

This community is confined to disturbed, fertile, light soils in the damper oceanic climate of south-west England. It is found only in The Scillies and south-west Cornwall. It is closely associated with the Briza minor - Silene gallica community, which often replaces it on drier soils.

Subcommunities

There are three subcommunities:
 the Aphanes microcarpa - Ranunculus muricatus subcommunity
 the ''Valerianella locusta - Barbula convoluta subcommunity the Vicia hirsuta - Papaver dubium'' subcommunity

References

OV06